The NWA Tri-State Heavyweight Championship was a professional wrestling heavyweight championship in Tri-States Wrestling (NWA Tri-State). The original version was created in 1954, however, it was phased out in favor of the NWA World Junior Heavyweight Championship. 

The Alabama version of the NWA Tri-State Heavyweight Championship existed from 1960 until 1974. It was defended primarily in Alabama under the banner of NWA Tri-State Wrestling, and at times in Tennessee for NWA Mid-America. Because the championship was a professional wrestling championship, it was not won or lost competitively but instead by the decision of the bookers of a wrestling promotion. The championship was awarded after the chosen team "won" a match to maintain the illusion that professional wrestling is a competitive sport.

The title was revived to replace the NWA North American Heavyweight Championship as the promotion's top singles title after Bill Watts left to form Mid-South Wrestling in 1979. It was vacated and decommissioned when Tri-State promoter Leroy McGuirk closed the promotion in 1982.

Title history
Key

Names

Title history

NWA Tri-State Heavyweight Championship (Original version)

NWA Tri-State Heavyweight Championship (Alabama version)

NWA Tri-State Heavyweight Championship (Final version)

List of top combined reigns

Explanatory footnotes

References

General references

Specific

External links
 NWA Tri-State Heavyweight Championship at Wrestlingdata.com

Heavyweight wrestling championships
National Wrestling Alliance championships
NWA Mid-America championships
United States regional professional wrestling championships